Jan Tęczyński (1581–1637), of the Topór coat-of-arms, was governor of Kraków (1620–37), Crown Cupbearer (czesnik koronny) from 1618, starosta of Płock, and owner of Tenczyn and Rytwiany.

He was the son of Andrzej Tęczyński. In 1606 he married Dorota Mińska. As his three sons died young, he became the last of this line of the Tęczyński family.

In his youth Jan Tęczyński traveled throughout Europe and studied under Galileo. This experience led him to become a patron of the arts and sciences.  He expanded the palace at Rytwiany, and his court was always open to writers and philosophers, such as Jan Andrzej Morsztyn, one of the most celebrated poets of the Polish Baroque. Piotr Kochanowski dedicated to Tęczyński his translation of Torquato Tasso's Jerusalem Delivered.  Tęczyński was a patron of Jan Brożek, professor at the Kraków Academy. Tęczyński himself was also a writer.

His library and much of his wealth were inherited by the son-in-law of his brother Andrzej Tęczyński, Łukasz Opaliński, husband of Izabela, who was also a famous writer and patron of the arts and sciences.

See also
 House of Tęczyński

1581 births
1637 deaths
Jan